Filippo Volandri was the defending champion, but he was eliminated by Olivier Rochus in the semifinal.
Peter Luczak defeated Rochus in the final 6–3, 3–6, 6–1.

Seeds

Draw

Final four

Top half

Bottom half

References
 Main Draw
 Qualifying Draw

Zucchetti Kos Tennis Cup - Singles
Internazionali di Tennis del Friuli Venezia Giulia
Zucchetti